Risto Olli Pekka Puhakka (11 April 1916 in Sortavala – 28 January 1989) was one of the top scoring aces in the Finnish Air Force with 42 confirmed victories.

Biography
Puhakka served in Fighter Squadrons (LLv's) 26, 30, 28, 24, 32 during the Winter War and the Second World War. He became an ace during the Winter War, downing 5½  Soviet aircraft. Puhakka was actively flying at the front almost during the whole war. 

During his 401 combat missions, Olli Puhakka scored 42 confirmed victories in Fokker D.XXIs, Fiat G.50s and Bf 109 Gs. On 21 December 1944, he was awarded the Mannerheim Cross. 

Puhakka resigned from the air force in 1946 and flew commercial airliners until his retirement in 1971.

Victories

References

Notes

Bibliography

 Keskinen, Kalevi; Stenman, Kari and Niska, Klaus. Hävittäjä-ässät (Finnish Fighter Aces) (in Finnish). Espoo, Finland: Tietoteas, 1978. .
 Stenman, Kari and Keskinen, Kalevi. Finnish Aces of World War 2 (Aircraft of the Aces 23). Oxford, UK: Osprey Publishing, 1998. .

See also
 List of World War II aces from Finland

1916 births
1989 deaths
Finnish Air Force personnel
Winter War pilots
Finnish World War II flying aces
Commercial aviators
People from Sortavala
People from Viipuri Province (Grand Duchy of Finland)
Knights of the Mannerheim Cross